Pember may refer to:

Places
Pember, Hampshire

People
 Arthur Pember (1835–1886), British sportsman and journalist
 G. H. Pember (1837–1910), American theologian and author
 Phoebe Pember (1823–1913), American nurse
 Clifford Pember (1924–2020), Welsh World War II veteran
 Ron Pember (1934–2022), English actor, stage director, and dramatist